Constantin Braun (born March 11, 1988) is a German professional ice hockey defenceman who is currently playing for and captain of the Bietigheim Steelers of the Deutsche Eishockey Liga (DEL).

Playing career
Braun was drafted by the Los Angeles Kings in the 2006 NHL Entry Draft in the sixth round, 164th overall, and began playing professionally with Berlin in the 2005–06 season.

As a five-time German champion, and following his 15th season with Eisbären Berlin, Braun was reunited with his brother, Laurin, as he was loaned to Krefeld Pinguine for the following 2020–21 season on 9 December 2020.

International play
Braun has played internationally for the German national team. Braun was named to the Germany men's national ice hockey team for competition at the 2014 IIHF World Championship.

Family
His younger brother, Laurin, also plays for the Eisbären. His older brother, Simon trains the Eisbären junior team. 
Constantin Braun is a father of 3.

Career statistics

Regular season and playoffs

International

Awards and honors

References

External links

1988 births
Living people
SC Bietigheim-Bissingen players
Eisbären Berlin players
German ice hockey defencemen
Krefeld Pinguine players
Los Angeles Kings draft picks
People from Lampertheim
Sportspeople from Darmstadt (region)